Sassari Calcio Latte Dolce is an Italian football club based in Sassari /  Usini , Sardinia. They currently play in Eccellenza.

History
The club was founded in 1973 as Unione Sportiva Latte Dolce, as the club of the omonymous neighborhood in Sassari, the second city in Sardinia.

In the season 2012–13, the team was promoted for the first time, from Eccellenza Sardinia to Serie D to fill the vacancies created.  In 2017 the club changed name adding Sassari Calcio in order to represent the entire city together with the historical and older club Sassari Torres. In 2020, participated for the first time to the Coppa Italia, the highest professional cup in Italy, losing in the first round against F.C. Südtirol.

Stadium
The team play in the Stadio Vanni Sanna in Sassari, the complex is belong S.E.F. Torres 1903, the main club of the city. Here plays also Torres Calcio Femminile.

League and cup history

{|class="wikitable"
|-bgcolor="#efefef"
! Season
! Div.
! Pos.
! Pl.
! W
! D
! L
! GS
! GA
! P
!Domestic Cup
!colspan=2|Other
!Notes
|-bgcolor=PowderBlue
|align=center|2017–18
|align=center|Serie D
|align=center|13
|align=center|34
|align=center|10
|align=center|10
|align=center|14
|align=center|39
|align=center|45
|align=center|40
|align=center|
|align=center|
|align=center|
|align=center|
|-bgcolor=PowderBlue
|align=center|2018–19
|align=center|Serie D
|align=center|4
|align=center|38
|align=center|19
|align=center|14
|align=center|5
|align=center|56
|align=center|32
|align=center|69
|align=center|
|align=center|
|align=center|
|align=center|
|-bgcolor=PowderBlue
|align=center|2019–20
|align=center|Serie D
|align=center|5
|align=center|26
|align=center|14
|align=center|3
|align=center|9
|align=center|40
|align=center|29
|align=center|45
|align=center|
|align=center|
|align=center|
|align=center|
|-bgcolor=PowderBlue
|align=center|2020–21
|align=center|Serie D
|align=center|10
|align=center|34	
|align=center|11 	
|align=center|11
|align=center|12
|align=center|45
|align=center|42
|align=center|44
|align=center|
|align=center|
|align=center|
|align=center|
|-bgcolor=PowderBlue
|align=center|2021–22
|align=center|Serie D
|align=center|
|align=center|
|align=center|	 	
|align=center|
|align=center|
|align=center|
|align=center|
|align=center|
|align=center|
|align=center|
|align=center|
|align=center|
|}

See also
 S.E.F. Torres 1903
 Torres Calcio Femminile
 Dinamo Basket Sassari

References

External links
Official website 

Football clubs in Italy
Football clubs in Sardinia
Association football clubs established in 1973
1973 establishments in Italy